The Anthem may refer to:

 "The Anthem" (Good Charlotte song), 2002
 "The Anthem" (Pitbull song), 2007
 "The Anthem" (Planetshakers song), 2012
 The Anthem (album), a 2005 album by Darin
 The Anthem (music venue), in Washington, DC
 "The Anthem", a 1999 song by Sway & King Tech, from the album This or That

See also 
 Anthem (disambiguation)